The National Institute of Social Sciences (NISS) is one of the oldest honorary societies in the United States. The stated mission of NISS is to promote the study of the social sciences, to support social science research and discussion, and to honor individuals who have rendered distinguished service to humanity.

NISS is headquartered in New York City.

Current activities 

Since 1913, NISS has presented Gold Medals that celebrate the accomplishments of distinguished Americans and world leaders who have contributed at the highest level to the welfare and improvement of society. Gold Medal honorees, which include four U.S. presidents and 16 Nobel Prize winners, represent outstanding achievement in the social sciences, law, government, education, philanthropy, the arts, medicine, science, and industry.

The organization sponsors speaking engagements on critical issues. It supports graduate students in the final stages of completing their dissertations through a grants program.

Early history 
The National Institute of Social Sciences traces its origins to the American Social Science Association, or ASSA, which was established in 1865 in Boston as the American Association for the Promotion of Social Science. The ASSA was chartered by an act of the 56th Congress on January 28, 1899. In 1912, the ASSA established NISS as a distinct department. In 1926, when the ASSA dissolved, an act of Congress transferred its congressional charter to the NISS "for the furtherance of the interests of social science."

Gold Medals 
The NISS original constitution states the organization's goal "to promote the study of Social Science and to reward distinguished services rendered to humanity, either by election to the National Institute, or by the bestowal of medals or other insignia.”
 
In 1913 the NISS bestowed its first Gold Medals in recognition of significant contributions to humanity. The first recipients were William Howard Taft, 27th President of the United States, Archer M. Huntington, founder of the Hispanic Society of America, and Samuel L. Parrish, founder of the Parrish Art Museum in Southampton, NY. Each year since 1913, (except for 1922), the organization has presented Gold Medals to distinguished individuals.

The National Institute's Gold Medal was designed by Laura Gardin Fraser, a noted sculptor with a specialty in medals.

Honorees 

1913
 Archer M. Huntington
 Samuel L. Parrish
 William Howard Taft

1914
 Charles W. Eliot
 George W. Goethals
 Abraham Jacobi
 Henry Fairfield Osborn

1915
 Luther Burbank
 Andrew Carnegie

1916
 Robert Bacon
 Helen Hartley Jenkins
 Adolph Lewisohn

1917
 George W. Crile
 William Gorgas
 John Purroy Mitchel
 Mihailo Pupin

1918
 Henry P. Davison
 Herbert Hoover
 William J. Mayo

1919
 Samuel Gompers
 William Henry Welch

1920
 Alexis Carrel
 Henry Holbrook Curtis
 Wilfred Grenfell
 Harry Pratt Judson

1921
 Charles F. Chandler
 Calvin Coolidge
 Marie Curie
 Cleveland Hoadley Dodge

1923
 Charles B. Davenport
 Auckland Geddes
 Emory R. Johnson
 Jean Jules Jusserand
 John D. Rockefeller

1924
 Walter Hampden Dougherty
 Charles Evans Hughes
 Caroline Berryman Spencer

1925
 Mary Williamson Averell (Mrs. Edward H. Harriman)
 William Hallock Park
 Elihu Root
 Owen D. Young

1926
 S. Parkes Cadman
 Clarence Mackay
 Stephen Mather
 Mary Schenck Woolman

1927
 George Pierce Baker
 Walter Damrosch
 Harry Emerson Fosdick
 Adolph Ochs

1928
 Liberty Hyde Bailey
 Robert W. DeForest
 Willis R. Whitney

1929
 Valeria Langeloth
 Rose Livingston
 John D. Rockefeller, Jr.
 James T. Shotwell
 Daniel Willard

1930
 Anna Billings Gallup
 George R. Minot
 William Lyon Phelps
 Marcella Sembrich
 Nathan Straus

1931
 Grace Abbott
 Richard Clarke Cabot
 Grace Goodhue Coolidge
 Frank B. Kellogg

1932
 Edward F. Allen
 James Howell Post
 William C. Redfield
 Gerard Swope

1933
 Newton D. Baker
 Clifford W. Beers
 Evangeline Booth

1934
 Eleanor Robson Belmont
 Walter B. Cannon
 Samuel Seabury

1935
 Cornelius N. Bliss
 Harvey Cushing
 Carter Glass
 George E. Vincent

1936
 Nicholas Murray Butler
 Dorothy Harrison Eustis
 William Edwin Hall
 J. Pierpont Morgan

1937
 James Rowland Angell
 Mary Louise Curtis (Mrs. Edward W. Bok)
 J. Edgar Hoover
 Wesley Clair Mitchell

1938
 John W. Davis
 Walter S. Gifford
 Dorothy Thompson

1939
 Martha Berry
 William Church Osborn
 George Wharton Pepper

1940
 Carrie Chapman Catt
 James E. West
 Wendell Willkie

1941
 Norman H. Davis 
 Florence Jaffray Harriman
 Al Smith

1942
 Anne O'Hare McCormick
 Donald Nelson
 Rufus B. von KleinSmid

1943
 Madame Chiang Kai-shek Soong Mei-ling
 Edwin Grant Conklin
 Mildred H. McAfee
 Juan Terry Trippe

1944
 Bernard Baruch
 Kate Trumbee Henry Pomeroy Davison
 James G. K. McClure

1945
 Vannevar Bush
 Emily Vanderbilt Sloane (Mrs. John Henry Hammond)
 William Mather Lewis

1946
 Virginia Gildersleeve
 Robert Moses
 Edward Stettinius, Jr.

1947
 Edward Johnson
 Katherine Lenroot
 Thomas J. Watson

1948
 Warren R. Austin
 Basil O'Connor
 Georgiana Farr Sibley

1949
 Lillian Moller Gilbreth
 George Catlett Marshall
 Alfred P. SloanJr.

1950
 Sarah Gibson Blanding
 Henry Bruere
 Carlos P. Romulo

1951
 Lewis W. Douglas
 John Foster Dulles
 Paul G. Hoffman
 Douglas MacArthur
 Bayard Foster Pope

1952
 Helen Keller
 Robert Abercrombie Lovett
 John J. McCloy
 Harold Raymond Medina

1953
 Jonas Salk
 E. Roland Harriman
 Oveta Culp Hobby
 Charles F. Kettering

1954
 Helen Dinsmore Huntington (Mrs. Lytle) Hull
 Howard Rusk
 Walter Bedell Smith

1955
 Samuel D. Leidesdorf
 Henry Cabot Lodge, Jr.
 Elisabeth Luce Moore

1956
 Henry Townley Heald
 Mary Pillsbury Lord
 Clarence G. Michalis

1957
 Billy Graham Jr.
 Alfred M. Gruenther
 Clare Booth Luce

1958
 Marian Anderson
 Robert B. Anderson
 Herbert Hoover, Jr.
 James Rhyne Killian Jr.

1959
 Helen Hayes
 Laurance Rockefeller

1960
 Rudolf Bing
 Gilbert Darlington
 Grayson L. Kirk
 Millicent C. McIntosh

1961
 Marie Graves Bullock
 Karl Menninger
 William C. Menninger
 Edward Durell Stone

1962
 Ralph J. Bunche
 Mary I. Bunting
 Lucius D. Clay
 John W. Gardner

1963
 Arthur Dean
 Katharine Elizabeth McBride
 Nathan Pusey
 Frank Stanton

1964
 Bob Hope
 Frederick R. Kappel
 Dean Rusk
 Margaret Chase Smith

1965
 Dorothy Buffum Chandler
 James A. Perkins
 Maxwell D. Taylor

1966
 G. Keith Funston
 Lady Bird Johnson
 Danny Kaye
 David Sarnoff
 Eric Sevareid
 Francis Spellman

1967
 David Rockefeller
 John D. Rockefeller III
 Laurance Rockefeller
 Nelson Rockefeller
 Winthrop Rockefeller

1968
 Eugene R. Black Sr.
 Anne Morrow Lindbergh
 Charles Lindbergh
 Ralph Washington Sockman

1969
 Frank Borman
 Theodore M. Hesburgh
 Lester B. Pearson
 Barbara Ward, Baroness Jackson of Lodsworth

1970
 Katharine Graham
 Lauris Norstad
 William P. Rogers
 Eric Sevareid

1971
 Joan Ganz Cooney
 Charles Malik
 Arthur K. Watson
 Thomas J. Watson, Jr.

1972
 George H. W. Bush
 Henry Kissinger
 Mary French Rockefeller
 Fulton J. Sheen

1973
 John P. Flynn
 Jean Kerr
 Paul Moore, Jr.
 Elliot L. Richardson

1974
 Peter M. Dawkins
 Golda Meir
 George Shultz
 Roy Wilkins

1975
 Nancy Hanks
 William E. Simon
 Deke Slayton
 Lowell Thomas
 Lowell Thomas, Jr.

1976
 Barry Goldwater
 John J. McCloy
 Norman Vincent Peale
 Peter G. Peterson
 Barbara Walters

1977
 John Young (astronaut)
 Anne Armstrong
 Milton Friedman
 Edwin Leather
 Dina Merrill
 Cliff Robertson
 William Rockefeller
 William B. Walsh

1978
 Henrik Beer
 Arthur F. Burns
 Julia Child
 James R. Dumpson
 Lila Acheson Wallace

1979
 McGeorge Bundy
 C. Douglas Dillon
 Jane Pickens
 Linus Pauling

1980
 Omar Bradley
 Alexander M. Haig
 Henry Richardson Labouisse Jr.
 William McChesney Martin Jr.
 William J. McGill
 Iphigene Ochs Sulzberger

1981
 Brooke Astor
 Walter P. Chrysler Jr.
 Jean MacArthur
 Drew Middleton
 John W. Young

1982
 Vernon Jordon
 Claiborne Pell
 S. Dillon Ripley
 Arthur Ross
 Lewis Thomas

1983
 Philip Habib
 John K. McKinley
 Patricia Neal
 Frank E. Taplin
 Marietta Peabody Tree

1984
 J. Peter Grace
 Kitty Carlisle Hart
 Warren H. Phillips

1985
 Hugh Bullock
 Vartan Gregorian
 Jeane Kirkpatrick
 Beverly Sills
 Brian E. Urquhart

1986
 I. I. Rabi
 Juanita Kidd Stout
 Eudora Welty

1987
 John Carter Brown
 Rudy Giuliani
 Vernon A. Walters
 Susan H. Whitmore (Mrs. Harold P. Whitmore)

1988
 James McNaughton Hester
 Paul Volcker
 Caspar Weinberger

1989
 Robert MacCrate
 Philippe de Montebello
 Paul Nitze
 Alice Tully

1990
 Hugh R. K. Barber
 Kathryn Wasserman Davis
 Shelby Cullom Davis
 Angier Biddle Duke
 Moorhead C. Kennedy, Jr.
 Thomas R. Pickering
 Dorothy Sarnoff

1991
 Brendan Gill
 Enid A. Haupt
 Joseph Verner Reed, Jr.
 William vanden Heuvel

1992
 William F. Buckley Jr.
 Roy M. Goodman
 Arthur M. Schlesinger Jr.
 Richard Boies Stark

1993
 Robin Chandler Duke
 Henry Clay Frick II
 Ellen V. Futter
 August Heckscher II

1994
 Louis Auchincloss
 Kent Barwick
 Mrs. Edward T. Chase
 Daniel Patrick Moynihan

1995
 Peter Flanigan
 Oseola McCarty
 Anne Meyer
 John C. Whitehead

1996
 Madeleine Albright
 Richard Holbrooke
 C. Everett Koop
 James Levine
 Howard Phipps, Jr.

1997
 Anthony Drexel Duke
 Richard G. Lugar
 Helen Coley Nauts
 Bill Richardson

1998
 John T. Casteen III
 Abby M. O'Neill
 Jay Rockefeller

1999
 John Kenneth Galbraith
 Arnold J. Levine
 Paul Samuelson
 Nelson Talbot III Strobe Talbott

2000
 Wilhelmina Holladay
 William Luers
 Judith Rodin
 Tom Seaver

2001
 Robert Curvin
 Avery Dulles
 Anna Glen Vietor
 James Wolfensohn

2002
 Bruce Babbitt
 William Joseph McDonough
 John Negroponte
 Judith Shapiro

2003
 Donna de Varona
 Bernard Gersten
 Richard Meier
 Ted Turner

2004
 Kofi Annan
 Peter D. Bell
 Adele Chatfield-Taylor
 Vishakha N. Desai

2005
 John Guare
 Ada Louise Huxtable
 George Rupp

2006
 Lewis B. Cullman
 Hanna Holborn Gray
 John Sculley

2007
 Jacques Barzun
 David McCullough
 Sandra Day O'Connor

2008
 Kenneth T. Jackson
 Robert MacNeil
 Robert M. Morgenthau

2009
 Doris Kearns Goodwin
 Thomas L. Haskell
 Eric Kandel

2010
 Agnes Gund
 Garrison Keillor
 Margaret Mead (in memoriam)

2011
 Chuck Close
 Donald Henderson
 James Q. Wilson

2012
 Robert Caro
 Paul Goldberger
 William M. Manger

2013
 John H. Adams
 Wallace Smith Broecker
 Arthur Ochs Sulzberger, Jr.

2014
 Eric Foner
 Philippe Petit
 E.O. Wilson

2015
 John C. Bogle
 Paul Krugman
 Michelle Kwan

2016
 Pauline Newman
 Richard L. Ottinger
 Robert D. Putnam

2017
 Ron Chernow
 Robert J. Shiller
 Michael I. Sovern

2018
 Daniel Kahneman
 Geraldine Kunstadter
 Elizabeth Barlow Rogers

2019
 Paul Farmer
 Peter Gelb

2020
 Max Stier
 Darren Walker
 Judy Woodruff

2021
 Henry Louis Gates Jr.
 Amartya Sen
 Kwame Anthony Appiah

2022
 Philip J. Landrigan
 Jennifer J. Raab
 Neil deGrasse Tyson

Research support 
In its first two decades, the National Institute published an annual Journal of the National Institute of Social Sciences, which included articles by members and scholars. The 1920 journal, for example, included articles by the noted economist and sociologist Thorstein Veblen and academic Virginia Gildersleeve.

In the 1970s, the National Institute supported a national project on experiential education. The project was begun in 1974 by Frank Pace, Jr., the NISS president, to strengthen field experiential education and support the NISS's "original mission and function."

Grants and scholarships 
In 2011 the Institute began awarding Dissertation Grants (originally called Seed Grants) to graduate students completing dissertations in social science fields. In 2016, it was announced that Hirokazu Shirado, then a graduate student at Yale University, would receive the fourth Seed Grant through this program. The 2020 recipients were Gabriel Raeburn, a doctoral candidate in Religious Studies and History at the University of Pennsylvania, and Francisco Lara-García, a doctoral candidate and Paul Lazarsfeld Fellow in the Department of Sociology at Columbia University in the City of New York. The 2021 recipient was Emma Gilheany, a doctoral candidate in Anthropology at the University of Chicago. The 2022 recipients are Betsy Priem, Nicolas Rodrigo, Jessica Schirmer, Cameron McAllister, Brooke McKenna.

Advisory Council
In 2022, NISS President Fred Larsen and the Board of Governors established the first Advisory Council, composed of former Gold Medal Honorees, leading scholars in the social sciences and cognate fields, leaders of educational and not-for-profit institutions focused on the social sciences, and distinguished artists, journalists, and performers whose work affects and is concerned with the advancement of knowledge and the betterment of society.  The Inaugural Council consists of
 Kwame Anthony Appiah
 Paul Boghossian
 Anthea Butler
 Anthony Roth Costanzo
 Henry Louis Gates, Jr.
 James Grossman
 Kenneth T. Jackson
 Nancy Kidd
 Edward Liebow
 Louise Mirrer
 Jennifer Raab
 Elizabeth Barlow Rogers
 Amartya Sen
 Steven Rathgeb Smith
 Max Stier
 Stacy Wolf
 Judy Woodruff

References

Organizations established in 1913
Organizations based in New York City